The Fanambana Bridge is situated at the Fanambana River on Route nationale 5a between Vohemar and Sambava in Sava, Madagascar. This bridge is a cable-stayed bridge with fan system, completed in 1964.

References

Bridges in Madagascar